Jetons or jettons are tokens or coin-like medals produced across Europe from the 13th through the 18th centuries. They were produced as counters for use in calculation on a counting board, a lined board similar to an abacus. Jetons for calculation were commonly used in Europe from about 1200 to 1700, and remained in occasional use into the early nineteenth century. They also found use as a money substitute in games, similar to modern casino chips or poker chips.

Thousands of different jetons exist, mostly of religious and educational designs, as well as portraits, the last of which most resemble coinage, somewhat similar to modern, non-circulation commemorative coins. The spelling "jeton" is from the French; it is sometimes spelled "jetton" in English.

Roman calculi 
The Romans similarly used pebbles (in  "little stones", whence English calculate). Addition is straightforward, and relatively efficient algorithms for multiplication and division were known.

Middle Ages 
The custom of stamping counters like coins began in France, with the oldest known coming from the fiscal offices of the royal government of France and dating from around the middle of the 13th century. From the late 13th century to the end of the 14th century, jetons were produced in England, similar in design to contemporary Edwardian pennies. Although they were made of brass they were often pierced or indented at the centre to avoid them being plated with silver and passed off as real silver coins. By the middle of the 14th century, English jetons were being produced in a larger size, similar to the groat.

Throughout the 15th century competition from France and the Low Countries ended jeton manufacture in England, but not for long. Nuremberg jeton masters initially started by copying counters of their European neighbours, but by the mid 16th century they gained a monopoly by mass-producing cheaper jetons for commercial use. Later – "counter casting" being obsolete – production shifted to jetons for use in games and toys, sometimes copying more or less famous jetons with a political background.

Mints in the Low Countries in the late Middle Ages in general produced the counters for official bookkeeping. Most of them show the effigy of the ruler within a flattering text and on the reverse the ruler's escutcheon and the name or city of the accounting office.

During the Dutch Revolt (1568–1609) this pattern changed and by both parties, the North in front, about 2,000 different, mostly political, jetons were minted depicting the victories, ideals and aims. Specifically in the last quarter of the 16th century, where  or "beggars" made important military contributions to the Dutch side and bookkeeping was already done without counters, the production in the North was just for propaganda.

The mints and treasuries of the big estates in Central Europe used their own jetons and then had a number of them struck in gold and silver as New Year gifts for their employees, who in turn commissioned jetons with their own mottoes and coats-of-arms. In the sixteenth century the Czech Royal Treasury bought between two and three thousand pieces at the beginning of each year.

As Arabic numerals and the zero came into use, "pen reckoning" gradually displaced "counter casting" as the common accounting method.

Modern use

Monetary use 
In the 21st century jetons continue to be used in some countries as substitutes for coins in coin-operated public telephones or vending machines, because automatic valuation of coins by machines is unreliable or impossible for several reasons. They are usually made of metal or hard plastic and are generally called tokens in English-speaking countries. In German the word  refers specifically to casino tokens. In Polish the word , pronounced similarly to French , refers both to tokens used in vending machines, phones etc. and to those used in casinos. However in Hungary the word  is (somewhat dated) slang for money, particularly coins. Plastic jetons used to be used for paying the fare for the Star Ferry in Hong Kong.

Leisure use 

Apart from their monetary use in casinos, jetons are used in card games, particularly in France but also in Denmark. They are traditionally made of wood of different shapes and sizes to represent different values such as 1, 5, 10, 50 or 100 points. For example, in traditional French games, jetons are round and usually worth 1 unit; fiches are long and rectangular in shape and may be worth 10 to 20 jetons; contrats are the short rectangular counters and may be worth, say, 100 units.

The jetons are also stained or coloured so that each player can have his or her own colour. This facilitates scoring because players do not need to start with exactly the same number of counters. Nowadays plastic jetons are a cheap alternative. Games that typically use jetons include Nain Jaune, Belote, Piquet, Ombre, Mistigri, Danish Tarok and Vira. A dedicated box called virapulla is used to contain Vira jetons.

Other uses 
In France and other countries a jeton is also a token amount of money paid to members of a society or a legislative chamber each time they are present in a meeting.

See also 
 Casino token
 Devotional medal
 Location arithmetic
 Telephone token
 Gettone

References

Works cited

Further reading 
 
 

Token coins
Mechanical calculators
Card game equipment
Gaming devices